The 3rd congressional district of Tennessee is a congressional district in East Tennessee. It has been represented by Republican Chuck Fleischmann since January 2011.

Current boundaries
The district comprises two halves, joined through a narrow tendril in Roane County near Ten Mile.

The upper half encompasses all of Roane, Anderson, and Morgan counties, along with most of Scott, and half of Campbell County.

The lower half borders North Carolina to the east and Georgia to the south. It is composed of Hamilton, Polk, McMinn, Monroe, and Bradley County.

Characteristics
The third district has been centered on Chattanooga since before the Civil War.

In terms of density, the district is sparsely populated, as much of it is located within the Appalachian Mountains. Almost half of the district's population lives in Hamilton County.

Election results from presidential races 
Results Under Old Lines (2013-2023)

History 
The 3rd district is on the dividing line between counties and towns that favored or opposed Southern secession in the Civil War. George Washington Bridges was elected as a Unionist (the name used by a coalition of Republicans, northern Democrats and anti-Confederate Southern Democrats) to the Thirty-seventh Congress, but he was arrested by Confederate troops while en route to Washington, D.C. and taken back to Tennessee. Bridges was held prisoner for more than a year before he escaped and went to Washington, D.C., and assumed his duties on February 23, 1863; serving until March 3, 1863.

During much of the 20th century, southeastern Tennessee was the only portion of traditionally heavily Republican East Tennessee where Democrats were able to compete on a more-or-less even basis. The Chattanooga papers—the moderate-to-progressive Times and the archconservative Free Press (now consolidated into the Chattanooga Times Free Press)--printed diametrically opposed political editorials.  The northern counties have predominantly voted Republican since the 1860s, in a manner similar to their neighbors in the present 1st and 2nd districts. However, Democrats have received some support in coal mining areas (dating from the Great Depression). Also, in the years since World War II, the government-founded city of Oak Ridge, with its active labor unions and a population largely derived from outside the region, has been a source of potential Democratic votes.

This balance showed signs of changing beginning in the late 1950s, when rural and working-class whites began splitting their tickets in national elections to support Dwight Eisenhower and Barry Goldwater. In later years, the district warmly supported George Wallace in his third-party run for president in 1968, and gave equally strong support to Richard Nixon and Ronald Reagan, as well as Governors Winfield Dunn and Lamar Alexander. The district has only supported a Democrat for president twice in the last half century, in 1956 and 1992.  Even in those cases, that support was almost entirely attributable to the presence of native sons as vice presidential candidates.  In 1956, Senator Estes Kefauver, who had represented the 3rd from 1939 to 1949, was the Democratic vice presidential candidate.  In 1992, Senator Al Gore was Bill Clinton's running mate, but even with Gore's presence, the Democrats only carried the 3rd by 39 votes out of 225,000 cast.

Even as the district became friendlier to Republicans at the national level, Democrats still held their own at the local level. This trend was broken when Republican Bill Brock won the congressional seat in 1962, ending a 40-year run by Democrats.  He handed the seat to fellow Republican LaMar Baker in 1971. However, conservative Democrat Marilyn Lloyd (the widow of a popular television news anchorman in Chattanooga) regained it in 1974 and held it for 20 years.  As late as the early 1990s, area Democrats held at least half the local offices in the region, particularly in the southern portion.

As the 1990s wore on, Democrats slowly began losing even county and local offices that they had held for generations.  This trend actually began as early as 1992, when Lloyd barely held onto her seat against Republican Zach Wamp.  Lloyd retired in 1994, and Wamp narrowly won the race to succeed her as part of that year's massive GOP wave.  Wamp was handily reelected in 1996, and the Republicans have held it without serious difficulty since then. Indeed, the Democrats have only cleared 40 percent of the vote twice since Lloyd retired. Redistricting after the 2010 census consolidated the Republican hold on the seat, and it is now one of the most Republican districts in the nation.

Democrats still remain competitive in some local- and state-level races, particularly in Chattanooga and Oak Ridge.  Chattanooga also sends some Democrats to the state legislature. However, even moderately liberal politics are a very hard sell, and most of the area's Democrats—particularly outside Chattanooga—are quite conservative on social issues. The 3rd district is home to several Evangelical Protestant denominations and colleges, contributing to the area's social conservatism.

After Wamp's January 2009 announcement that he would run for governor in 2010 instead of seeking re-election, several candidates announced campaigns for the seat. As of March 2010, the Republican field included former state party chairwoman Robin Smith, Air Force Captain Rick Kernea, Tommy Crangle, Chattanooga attorney Chuck Fleischmann, Bradley County sheriff Tim Gobble, Art Rhodes, Van Irion, and Basil Marceaux. Fleischmann won the August 5, 2010 primary with about 28% of the total vote. Democratic candidates as of October 2009 were Paula Flowers of Oak Ridge, a former member of Governor Phil Bredesen's cabinet, and former Libertarian Party member Brent Benedict, who won the 2006 Democratic primary for the seat but lost the general election to Wamp. Both of those Democrats later abandoned their campaigns, but four other candidates placed their names on the ballot for the August 2010 Democratic primary: Alicia Mitchell of Oak Ridge, Brenda Freeman Short of East Ridge, and Brent Staton and John Wolfe of Chattanooga. Wolfe was the winner in the August 5, 2010 primary. Six independents also filed petitions to appear on the November 2010 ballot:  Don Barkman, Mark DeVol, Gregory C. Goodwin, Robert Humphries, Mo Kiah and Savas T. Kyriakidis.  Republican nominee Chuck Fleischmann won the general election in November 2010 with 57% of the vote, trailed by Democrat John Wolfe with 28%, and independent Savas Kyriakidis with 10%.

List of members representing the district

Recent election results

2012

2014

2016

2018

2020

2022

Historical district boundaries

See also

Tennessee's congressional districts
List of United States congressional districts

References

 Congressional Biographical Directory of the United States 1774–present
 Political Graveyard database of Tennessee congressmen

03
East Tennessee